Kentucky Route 286 (KY 286) is a  state highway in the U.S. state of Kentucky. The highway connects mostly rural areas of Ballard and McCracken counties with Wickliffe.

Route description
KY 286 begins at an intersection with KY 121 (Court Street) in Wickliffe, within Ballard County. It travels to the northeast and curves to the east and leaves Wickliffe. It travels to the east-northeast and intersects the southern terminus of KY 1279 (Cane Creek Cutoff Road). It continues to the east-northeast and intersects the southern terminus of KY 1345 (Wickliffe Road). Due to KY 1345 being a circular route, the two highways have a second intersection. KY 286 curves to the east-southeast and enters New York, where it intersects KY 802 (New York Road/LaCenter Road). It heads to the east-northeast and intersects the southern terminus of KY 358 (Hinkleville Road). In Gage, the highway intersects the southern terminus of KY 473 (Gage Road). It has an intersection with the southern terminus of KY 2532 (Kevil–Lovelaceville Road) and then the northern terminus of KY 1367 (Hamburg Road). KY 286 then enters McCracken County. It has an intersection with KY 726 (McKendree Church Road). Just after this, it meets its eastern terminus, an intersection with U.S. Route 62 (US 62; Blandville Road).

Major intersections

See also

References

0286
Transportation in Ballard County, Kentucky
Transportation in McCracken County, Kentucky